Mount Rosenwald is a mountain (3,450 m) which forms a distinctive landmark between the heads of Gallup and Baldwin Glaciers in the Queen Maud Mountains of Antarctica.

The mountain is entirely snow covered on the southwest side but has nearly vertical exposed-rock cliffs on the northeast side.  It was discovered and photographed by Admiral Byrd on the South Pole Flight of November 1929.  It was named by Byrd for Julius Rosenwald of Chicago, a contributor to the Byrd Antarctic Expedition of 1928-30 and 1933–35.

References

Queen Maud Mountains
Mountains of the Ross Dependency
Dufek Coast